Jeong Gyeong-ho may refer to:

Chung Kyung-ho (born 1980), footballer
Chung Kyung-ho (basketball) (born 1987)
Jung Kyung-ho (actor, born 1972)
Jung Kyung-ho (actor, born 1983)
Jung Kyung-ho (footballer, born 1987)